Cord compression may refer to:

Spinal cord compression
Umbilical cord compression